"I Don't Think I'm Ready for You" is a song recorded by Canadian country music artist Anne Murray.  It was released in April 1985 as the third single from her album Heart Over Mind.  The song reached number 4 on the RPM Country Tracks chart in August 1985.  The song was written by Steve Dorff, Snuff Garrett, Milton Brown and Billy Ray Reynolds.

Chart performance

References

1985 singles
1984 songs
Anne Murray songs
Capitol Records singles
Songs written by Steve Dorff
Songs written by Snuff Garrett
Song recordings produced by Jim Ed Norman